Fate/kaleid liner Prisma Illya is a 2013 anime series by Silver Link based on the manga by Hiroshi Hiroyama, which is itself a spin-off of Type-Moon's visual novel, Fate/stay night. Set in an alternate universe to Fate/stay night and its prequel, Fate/Zero, the series follows Illyasviel von Einzbern, aka Illya, who reluctantly becomes a magical girl tasked with capturing magical cards scattered across the city. The anime aired on Tokyo MX between July 13 and September 14, 2013 and was simulcast by Crunchyroll. The anime is produced by Silver Link and directed by Miki Minato, Takashi Sakamoto and Shin Ōnuma, written by Kenji Inoue and Hazuki Minase with music by Tatsuya Katō. The opening theme song is "starlog" by Choucho and the ending theme song is "Prism Sympathy" by StylipS.

A second season, Fate/kaleid liner Prisma Illya 2wei!, aired between July 10 and September 11, 2014. The second season's opening theme is "moving soul" by Minami Kuribayashi and the ending theme is "Two By Two" by Yumeha Kouda. The first two seasons are licensed in North America by Sentai Filmworks. The third season, Fate/kaleid liner Prisma Illya 2wei Herz!, aired between July 25 and December 26, 2015.

A fourth season, Fate/kaleid liner Prisma Illya 3rei!, aired between July 3, 2016 and September 21, 2016. The opening theme is "Asterism" by Choucho while the ending themes are "Whimsical Wayward Wish" by Technoboys Pulcraft Green-Fund feat. Yumeha Kouda. The ending theme for episode nine is "Cuddle" by ChouCho.

Series overview

Episode list

Fate/kaleid liner Prisma Illya (2013)

Fate/kaleid liner Prisma Illya 2wei! (2014)

Fate/kaleid liner Prisma Illya 2wei Herz! (2015)

Fate/kaleid liner Prisma Illya 3rei! (2016)

References

External links
Official Website 

Fate/kaleid liner Prisma Illya
Fate/kaleid liner Prisma Illya